The naval Battle of Ostia took place in 849 in the Tyrrhenian Sea between Muslim army and an Italian league of Papal, Neapolitan, Amalfitan, and Gaetan ships. The battle ended in favor of the Italian league, as they defeated the pirates. It is one of the few events to occur in southern Italy during the ninth century that is still commemorated today, largely through the walls named after Leo and for the Renaissance painting Battaglia di Ostia by Raphael.

Background
Starting in 827, Muslim forces began the conquest of Sicily. In 846, Muhammad Abul Abbas of Sicily, emir of the Aghlabids invaded eastern Rome, plundering various basilicas, including Old Saint Peter's which was outside the Aurelian walls, for their treasures.

Battle
News of a massing of Arab ships off Sardinia reached Rome early in 849. A Christian armada, commanded by Caesar, son of Sergius I of Naples, was assembled off recently refortified Ostia, and Pope Leo IV came out to bless it and offer a mass to the troops. After the pirate ships appeared, battle was joined with the Neapolitan galleys in the lead. Midway through the engagement, a storm divided the Muslims and the Christian ships managed to return to port. The Arabs, however, were scattered far and wide, with many ships lost and others sent ashore. When the storm died down, the remnants of the Arab fleet were easily picked off, with many prisoners taken.

Aftermath
In the aftermath of the battle, much booty washed ashore and was pillaged by the locals, per ius naufragii. The prisoners taken in battle were forced to work in chain gangs building the Leonine Wall which was to encompass the Vatican Hill. Rome would never again be approached by an Arab army.

See also 

 Papal Navy

Notes

Sources
Llewellyn, Peter. Rome in the Dark Ages. London: Faber and Faber, 1970.

Ostia
Ostia
Military history of Naples
Duchy of Gaeta
Ostia
Duchy of Amalfi
Ostia (Rome)
Ostia
849